Kristian Andersen is a Danish evolutionary biologist and professor in the Department of Immunology and Microbiology at the Scripps Research Institute in La Jolla, California.

Andersen obtained a BSc in molecular biology from Aarhus University in 2004, and a PhD in immunology from the University of Cambridge in 2009.

COVID-19
Early in the COVID-19 pandemic, Andersen and other scientists were consulted by the NIH and NIAID about the possibility of a lab leak. Andersen, in an email to Anthony Fauci in January 2020, told Fauci, the government’s top infectious disease expert, that some features of the virus made him wonder whether it had been engineered, and noted that he and his colleagues were planning to investigate further by analyzing the virus’s genome.  However, some time later, Andersen was the lead author of the scientific paper The proximal origin of SARS-CoV-2, published in Nature Medicine in March 2020, which concluded that "SARS-CoV-2 is not a laboratory construct or a purposefully manipulated virus". Later that year, Andersen’s lab was awarded an $8.9 million grant by NIAID. In a 2022 paper, Andersen concluded that animals sold in a market in Wuhan, China, were most likely to be the source of the virus.

References 

Living people
Danish virologists
Aarhus University alumni
Alumni of the University of Cambridge
Scripps Research faculty
Year of birth missing (living people)
Danish expatriates in the United Kingdom
Danish expatriates in the United States
Evolutionary biologists
21st-century Danish scientists
Danish biologists
21st-century biologists